Antoine Dorsaz (born 2 March 1989 in Martigny, Valais) is a Swiss retired pair skater. With former partner Anaïs Morand, he is the 2008–2010 Swiss national champion.

Career 
Morand and Dorsaz teamed up in 2005. They spent their first two seasons together on the junior circuit. In 2008-9 they competed in both juniors and seniors, finishing 12th at the European Championships and 10th at the World Junior Championships. They were not able to qualify a spot for Switzerland for the Winter Olympics.

Morand and Dorsaz began the 2009-10 season at the 2009 Nebelhorn Trophy, where they qualified a spot for Switzerland at the 2010 Winter Olympics. They continued to skate on the junior Grand Prix circuit and moved up to 8th at the European Championships. They were 15th at the Olympics and moved up to 13th at Worlds. Dorsaz retired from competitive skating after the 2010 season, citing lack of motivation.

Programmes 
(with Morand)

Competitive highlights 
(with Morand)

References

External links 

 

1989 births
Living people
People from Martigny
Swiss male pair skaters
Figure skaters at the 2010 Winter Olympics
Olympic figure skaters of Switzerland
Sportspeople from Valais